The men's 5000 metres at the 2022 World Athletics U20 Championships was held at the Estadio Olímpico Pascual Guerrero in Cali, Colombia on 1 August 2022.

22 athletes from 16 countries entered to the competition.

Records
U20 standing records prior to the 2022 World Athletics U20 Championships were as follows:

Results
The final race started at 17:26 on 1 August 2022. The results were as follows:

References

5000 metres men
Long distance running at the World Athletics U20 Championships